Torrita Tiberina is a comune (municipality) in the Metropolitan City of Rome in the Italian region Lazio, located about  north of Rome.

Torrita Tiberina borders the following municipalities: Filacciano, Montopoli di Sabina, Nazzano, Poggio Mirteto.

Demographic evolution

References

External links
 Official website

Cities and towns in Lazio